The 1977 Nations motorcycle Grand Prix was the fourth round of the 1977 Grand Prix motorcycle racing season. It took place on 15 May 1977 at the Autodromo Dino Ferrari.

500cc classification

350 cc classification

250 cc classification

125 cc classification

50 cc classification

References

Italian motorcycle Grand Prix
Nations Grand Prix
Nations Grand Prix